Nolan Ryan's Baseball (known in Japan as ) is a baseball video game endorsed by then-Texas Rangers baseball player Nolan Ryan; one of the most popular baseball players of the late 20th century. It has no licensing from Major League Baseball and the Major League Baseball Players Association; meaning that Nolan Ryan is the only non-fictional ballplayer in the entire game. All the other players have names that appear to be given names while Nolan Ryan uses his surname.

Gameplay
Different modes for playing include exhibition and regular season (lasting anywhere from ten games per team to an impressive 100 games per team). Unusual for a game at that time, it allowed a position player to be chosen as a relief pitcher or even as a starting pitcher. There is no designated hitter rule in this game so that the pitchers must go up to bat with their .150 batting average (which is below the Mendoza Line). While pitchers are not expected to hit above the Mendoza Line, having a hitter (or a group of hitters) go through a season with a batting average below .200 could indicate a lack of player skill.

There is no playoffs mode after regular season because all the teams are under one league. However, if more than one team has the lead for the pennant, a short elimination tournament will be held to determine the champion. The graphics look childish although their pitches are similar in speed to the actual Major League Baseball of that time. Players also have a tendency to march down the field at a slow speed regardless of their ratings and throws from the outfield tend to be less powerful than similar throws done from the infield.

The stats are followed throughout the entire year (for all the teams involved) and are adjusted after every play. Baseball players can be created from scratch, traded to other teams in favor of their pre-existing players, traded in for free agents, and have their attributes altered in order to make the perfect ballplayer.

Reviews
Nintendo Power gave the game scores of 66% for play control, 60% for gameplay challenge, and 50% for the game overall theme and fun factor.

References

Web

Magazine
Nintendo Power, Pak Watch - Super Nintendo Entertainment System Development Dispatch (listed as being shown at the 1991 Summer CES), Publication date: September 1991, Volume: 28, Pages: 97
Nintendo Power, Now Playing Review - George and Rob, Publication date: January 1992, Volume: 32, Pages: 102
Nintendo Power, Review, Publication date: January 1992, Volume: 32, Pages: 103

External links
Nolan Ryan's Baseball soundtrack at SNESmusic
Super Stadium soundtrack at SNESmusic

1991 video games
Affect (company) games
Baseball video games
Romstar games
SETA Corporation games
Super Nintendo Entertainment System games
Super Nintendo Entertainment System-only games
Video games developed in Japan
Multiplayer and single-player video games
Cultural depictions of American men
Cultural depictions of baseball players
Video games based on real people